These were the team rosters of the nations participating in the Boys' ice hockey tournament of the 2012 Winter Youth Olympics. Each team was permitted a roster of 15 skaters and 2 goaltenders.

Austria 
The following is the Austrian roster for the Boys' ice hockey tournament at the 2012 Winter Youth Olympics.

Head coach: Kurt Harand

Canada 
The following is the Canadian roster for the Boys' ice hockey tournament at the 2012 Winter Youth Olympics.

Head coach: Curtis Hunt

Finland 
The following is the Finnish roster for the Boys' ice hockey tournament at the 2012 Winter Youth Olympics.

Head coach: Tomi Lämsä

Russia 
The following is the Russian roster for the Boys' ice hockey tournament at the 2012 Winter Youth Olympics.

Head coach: Pavel Baulin

United States 
The following is the American roster for the Boys' ice hockey tournament at the 2012 Winter Youth Olympics.

Head coach: Ben Smith

References

Ice hockey at the 2012 Winter Youth Olympics